Clay Township is one of the seventeen townships of Highland County, Ohio, United States. As of the 2010 census the population was 1,431, up from 1,219 at the 2000 census.

Geography
Located in the southwestern corner of the county, it borders the following townships:
Salem Township - north
Hamer Township - northeast
Whiteoak Township - east
Washington Township, Brown County - south
Pike Township, Brown County - southwest corner
Green Township, Brown County - west

No municipalities are located in Clay Township, although the unincorporated community of Buford lies in the center of the township.

Name and history
It is one of nine Clay Townships statewide.

Government
The township is governed by a three-member board of trustees, who are elected in November of odd-numbered years to a four-year term beginning on the following January 1. Two are elected in the year after the presidential election and one is elected in the year before it. There is also an elected township fiscal officer, who serves a four-year term beginning on April 1 of the year after the election, which is held in November of the year before the presidential election. Vacancies in the fiscal officership or on the board of trustees are filled by the remaining trustees.

References

External links
County website

Townships in Highland County, Ohio
Townships in Ohio